A Farcaster is an instantaneous transportation device in the fictional Hyperion universe. Farcasters allow two points separated by a vast distance to be brought together at a Farcaster Portal.  The Farcaster network connects hundreds of planets of the Hegemony of Man into their WorldWeb. The Farcaster network allowed transport between connected worlds without any time discrepancy, unlike Hawking drive (Faster-than-light) transport provided by spaceships of the Hegemony era. The Farcaster was developed by the Artificial Intelligences (AIs) of the TechnoCore and given to humanity sometime after the Hegira.

It was the destruction of the Farcaster network at the order of Hegemony CEO Meina Gladstone in 2852 which precipitated the Fall.

About the WorldWeb Farcaster network
The roughly 250 worlds which are connected by Farcaster are known collectively as the WorldWeb. Each world has thousands, if not millions, of Farcaster connections with every other planet in the Web; all of which are connected through singularity spheres located in orbit of the world they service. Though truly there is only one connection to 'The Void Which Binds', an invisible and intangible domain which permeates the known universe, while its precise nature is poorly understood, it is used by various entities in the universe for travel, communication and even habitation. The actual number of portals is irrelevant, as all are the same portal.  At the height of the Hegemony, it was common for the extremely wealthy to construct houses on multiple worlds, with separate rooms connected by Farcaster.  It was also common for planets to rely so heavily on the Farcasters and the ease of trade allowed through them, that they produced little or no natural foodstuffs of their own.  In this sense, the Farcaster can be likened to the blood vessels of the human body, essential for life.

Planets colonized by the Hegemony, but not inducted into the Farcaster network, are not considered members of the Worldweb. Trade and Hegemony support are available to planets outside the WorldWeb, but interstellar travel between worlds can take months of ship time, equivalent to years or decades of observer time. As such, being connected to the WorldWeb was a major goal for many planetary governments.

Before planetside Farcaster portals can be installed (often in large 'concourses', but also on a private scale, in some cases used as 'doors' between rooms in expensive multi-planetary homes), an orbiting singularity sphere the size of a small moon must be constructed. This process in itself can take years. Getting to the point of singularity sphere construction can take even longer.

Whereas planetside Farcaster portals can transport people, goods, or even personal aircraft and luxury vehicles, orbiting farcasters can be constructed capable of admitting cargo and military ships to a planetary system.

Construction and Mechanics of Farcasters: The TechnoCore's Myths
The Big Mistake of '38 was caused by an artificially created black hole being accidentally dropped into the Earth's core.  This led to the apparent destruction of Earth and the Hegira.  During this time, the Farcaster was developed by the AI TechnoCore and given to mankind.  Farcasters use singularities (artificially created black holes) to generate warps in spacetime.  All knowledge of the Farcasters and how they worked was based on information given by the TechnoCore and the larger part of these knowledge was later proven to be false by Aenea.

When a world was ready to be admitted into the WorldWeb, the military body F.O.R.C.E began construction of a singularity sphere in orbit around the planet being joined to the Web.  Construction of the large sphere could take decades, in part because construction materials had to be transported via FTL Hawking drive spaceships, which accrued time debts in their travels.  However, once a singularity sphere was finished, millions of Farcaster Portals could be opened on the planet below, connecting to all other planets in the WorldWeb.

Portals varied in size, from small doorways, river-spanning arches, and vast orbital rings, allowing torchships to travel by Farcaster.  Each trip through a Farcaster was instantaneous; the traveller felt a slight tingle as they passed through the portal before immediately arriving at his or her destination but no other indication of traversing large interstellar distances.

The Fall of the Farcasters
In 2852, the AI TechnoCore's treachery was uncovered: they had been using the Farcasters as part of a giant computer, connecting each human who passed through a portal to their neural net to increase its processing power as needed.  The Hegemony CEO Meina Gladstone was also told that the TechnoCore resided within the WorldWeb itself, the dimensionless space between Farcaster Portals.  When it was revealed that the supposed invasion by the Ousters was actually being perpetrated by the TechnoCore, CEO Gladstone decided to destroy every singularity sphere in the WorldWeb - supposedly severing the TechnoCore's link to humanity.

The TechnoCore were also revealed to be plotting to kill humanity with the use of a large Deathwand device, and the destruction of the Farcasters was timed to allow for the destruction of this weapon as it passed through a Farcaster Portal to Hyperion.  Because of the necessity of destroying the Deathwand weapon, the Farcaster network was destroyed without much advance notice.  Thousands of people were killed while stepping through a Farcaster portal which suddenly closed mid-step, slicing them in half; hundreds more were lost to the gap between Farcasters.  Parents working on different planets from their children suddenly found themselves separated by light years instead of a single step through a Farcaster portal.

Riots swiftly followed the destruction of the WorldWeb, but it was the long-term effects of this action which devastated the Hegemony of Man.  Worlds were so dependent on the Farcasters for importing foodstuffs that many planets began to starve. Essential medicines might only be available on a single world, which was suddenly years away.  Some planetary systems suffered more than others: while Renaissance Minor was mostly agricultural land and capable of supporting Renaissance Vector, worlds like Heaven's Gate and Sol Draconi had their populations decimated and their terraforming efforts reversed over the next few hundred years, making the worlds uninhabitable again.

Aenea's Revelations: The Truth about the Farcasters
Over 270 years after the destruction of the WorldWeb and the Fall, the young woman Aenea, child of a human woman and AI cybrid, began to reveal the truth of the TechnoCore's motivations and involvement with humanity through the Pax Church. She also revealed the truth about the Farcasters.

The TechnoCore built the Farcaster network and Fatline transmitters using the same principle, 'The Void Which Binds'. While the TechnoCore saw this as a Planck-dimension of huge energy with fantastic potential, Aenea revealed 'The Void Which Binds' to be an essential part of the universe, literally, the domain of love as a force. In investigating 'The Void Which Binds' , the TechnoCore also found lifeforms there, of such level of advancement that the AIs were frightened.  Experiments carried out on the Void led to the development of the Fatline and the Farcaster network, both of which allowed travel through the Void but which were also were destructive to it.

The AI TechnoCore had deliberately dropped a black hole into Earth's core in their attempt to destroy humanity, but when they came across the entities in 'The Void Which Binds', they stopped this plan.  Instead, the Earth was moved to another Galaxy by the lifeforms residing in the Void.  The TechnoCore's terror at seeing this power led them to give the Farcasters to humanity.  As always, the TechnoCore had an ulterior motive. When an individual walked through a Farcaster portal, they passed through 'The Void Which Binds' , a timeless place where the TechnoCore could 'plug in' the person's brain into their vast neural net, focused on the problem of creating their UI (Ultimate Intelligence) — a being capable of dealing with the so-called 'Lions and Tigers and Bears' that resided within the Void.

When Meina Gladstone ordered the destruction of the Farcaster network, the TechnoCore's insidious plans were only halted temporarily. They struck an alliance with the Roman Catholic Church, giving their cruciform symbiotes to the body that would become the Pax and offering immortality to anyone who accepted the Pax. Aenea carried a virus in her body, which when she infected someone, would destroy the cruciform (which was revealed by Aenea to be another misuse of the Void Which Binds).

Notable Farcasters
The Grand Concourse
The Grand Concourse was a series of shopping streets on many worlds connected by Farcaster into the appearance of a single street.
The River Tethys
The River Tethys was gifted to the Hegemony of Man by the TechnoCore.  Every planet in the WorldWeb (and some who weren't, as was discovered by Aenea) had a section of a river connected by Farcaster to rivers on other worlds.  The Tethys was used for sightseeing and tourism mainly with some trade.  
Martin Silenus' House
Martin Silenus' House was a house that physically resided on multiple worlds of the WorldWeb, much as the houses of many famous or rich personalities of the Hegemony of Man used to do.  It was a huge expense and illustrated his rise to fame and fortune and, eventually his fall back to obscurity.  The notable features included windows to most of the best views of the web and a bathroom that consisted of an open raft in the middle of a waterworld.

Freecasting
Aenea's teachings about the Void Which Binds included four steps:
 Learning the Language of the Dead
 Learning the Language of the Living
 Listening to the Music of the Spheres
 Taking the First Step

Aenea's teachings related to the Void which binds: She taught that human memory resided in the Void Which Binds, that love was the force which held people's souls. The Music of the Spheres was the 'song' of a planet, each person living on that planet adding to its symphony. The final stage, taking the First Step, was to Freecast: travelling between the stars without needing a Farcaster device. The TechnoCore had constructed vast machinery to accomplish what any individual could do with some training.

References
Simmons, Dan. Hyperion. Random House, 1990. 
Simmons, Dan. The Fall of Hyperion. Random House, 1991. 
Simmons, Dan. Endymion. Random House, 1996. 
Simmons, Dan. The Rise of Endymion. Random House, 1998. 
Broderick, Damien. Earth is but a star: excursions through science fiction to the far future. UWA Publishing, 2001. 
Westfahl, Gary. The Greenwood encyclopedia of science fiction and fantasy, Vol. 3. Greenwood Publishing Group, 2005. 
Westfahl, Gary. Space and beyond: the frontier theme in science fiction. Greenwood Publishing Group, 2000. 
Hartwell, David G. and Cramer, Kathryn. The Space Opera Renaissance. Macmillan, 2007. 
Langford, David. Up Through An Empty House of Stars. Wildside Press, 2003. 
Morse, Donald E. Anatomy of Science Fiction. Cambridge Scholars Press, 2006. 

Faster-than-light travel in fiction
Hyperion Cantos